The capture of the Verkhovna Rada of the Autonomous Republic of Crimea on 27 February 2014 is an episode of the Crimean crisis in which Russian armed forces without insignias took over the Crimean Parliament Building, leading to the Russo-Ukrainian War. The Crimean Prosecutor's Office considered the incident a terrorist attack.

Background 
In February 2014, following the 2014 Ukrainian revolution that ousted the Ukrainian President, Viktor Yanukovych, the Russian leadership decided to "start working on returning Crimea to Russia" On February 25, a pro-Russian rally organized by the Crimean Front and Cossack organizations was held outside the building of the Crimean Verkhovna Rada. The protesters shouted pro-Russian slogans and demanded separation from Ukraine by holding a referendum. Before the protesters came the Speaker of the Verkhovna Rada of the ARC Volodymyr Konstantinov, announcing the extraordinary session of February 26. The media reported that a question about the withdrawal of the Crimea from Ukraine could be put to the session, but Konstantinov denied such rumors, calling it the provocation of the "Makeevka team in the Crimean government".

On February 26, two events took place in parallel by the walls of the ARC Verkhovna Rada: a pro-Ukrainian rally organized by the Mejlis of the Crimean Tatar People, which gathered up to ten thousand participants, and a pro-Russian rally of about 700 people, initiated by the "Rus unity" party. Due to unsatisfactory security measures taken by law enforcement officers, there were fights between pro-Ukrainian and pro-Russian rally participants, resulting in the death of two people of the pro-Russian rally. The pro-Russian rally was pushed to the inner court of the Crimean Verkhovna Rada, and scheduled the day before parliament's session was canceled.

Course of events 

On the morning of February 27, around 4:30, two groups of 10-15 armed men in military uniform without insignia entered the building of the Verkhovna Rada of Crimea and took control of it. Immediately after the capture, the attackers were barricaded indoors, having previously removed a small number of staff. Crimean People's Deputy from the UDAR Serhiy Kunitsyn said that the building was captured by 120 highly trained personnel who had a large arsenal of weapons, including automatic weapons, machine guns and grenade launchers, which would allow them to defend themselves for a long time. Persons who seized the building described themselves as self-defense activists for Russian-speaking citizens of Crimea, although the Mejlis leader, Refat Chubarov, said that Russian people were in charge of these people; later it became clear that the operation was orchestrated by Russian special forces.

At 8:30, the chairman of the Council of Ministers of the Crimea Anatolii Mohyliov appealed to the inhabitants of Crimea, informing them of the capture of the Verkhovna Rada of the ARC by unknown persons numbering about 50. At 9 o'clock Anatolii Mohyliov announced talks, but they did not have any result, because, according to Mohyliov, the unknown people refused to speak.

Valentyn Nalyvaichenko, the then-head of the SBU, believed that there was no forceful capture of the ARC Verkhovna Rada, as the local Crimean authorities, including the police, voluntarily transferred control over the building and weapons.

References

External links 
 Chronology of events that took place under the walls of the Verkhovna Rada of the ARC on February 26, 2014, restored per minute // "The Crimean Prosecutor's Office", 02/26/2018
 Occupation and resistance. Two years ago (photo gallery)
 Chubarov: "A year ago we were sure that the Crimea had been saved"

2014 in Ukraine
Annexation of Crimea by the Russian Federation
Attacks in Europe in 2014
Attacks on legislatures
History of Crimea
Simferopol
Battles of the Russo-Ukrainian War